Countess of Leicester is a title given to the wife of the Earl of Leicester. Women who have held the title include:

Elizabeth of Vermandois, Countess of Leicester (c.1085–1131)
Petronilla de Grandmesnil, Countess of Leicester (c.1145–1212) 
Loretta de Braose, Countess of Leicester (c.1185-c.1266)
Alix de Montmorency (died 1221)
Eleanor of England, Countess of Leicester (1215–1275) 
Aveline de Forz, Countess of Aumale (1259–1274) 
Blanche of Artois (c.1248-1302)
Alice de Lacy, 4th Countess of Lincoln (1281-1348)
Maud Chaworth (1282-1322)
Isabel of Beaumont (c.1320-1361)
Blanche of Lancaster (c.1345-1368)
Constance of Castile, Duchess of Lancaster (1354-1394)
Katherine Swynford (c.1350-1403)
Mary de Bohun (c.1369–1394)
Lettice Knollys (1543-1634)
Barbara Sidney, Countess of Leicester (1563-1621)
Dorothy Sidney, Countess of Leicester (c.1598-1659)
Margaret Coke, Countess of Leicester (1700-1775)
Alice Coke, Countess of Leicester (1855-1936)